Kaleidoscope at the Hub was an indoor mall in downtown Des Moines, Iowa. It was patronized by many of the more than 70,000 workers in the business district who visited the food courts during lunch hour. The Hub is accessible from the skywalk or from the ground level. It is in close proximity to many Des Moines attractions including the East Village and Wells Fargo Arena. Free WIFI is also available within the Hub to all visitors.

Restaurants
Many people who work downtown frequented the restaurants at the Hub. Those included Burger King, Bruegger's, Palmer's Deli and Market. These restaurants, except Burger King remain open in the western end.

Replacement
In May 2018, it was announced that Blackbird Investments plans to demolish the K-Scope. The majority of the Hub will be vacated and then removed in February 2019 to make room for a 33-story skyscraper. The mall is mostly vacant and this project hopes to revitalize the area. West of 6th St. is planned to remain.

External links
Facebook Page
Profile on City-Data.

Defunct shopping malls in the United States
Shopping malls in Iowa
Companies based in Iowa
Des Moines, Iowa